is a manga by Osamu Tezuka, and also the name of one of his books in Kodansha's line of "Osamu Tezuka Manga Complete Works" books containing a collection of Tezuka's short stories.  The stories included in this book are "Suspicion", "Insect Collector", "Insect Collector – The Butterfly Road Smells of Death", "Volcanic Eruption", "Peace Concert", "Activist Student", and "Old Folk's Home".

Plot
A man wants to kill his wife, and in order to do so, he begins inputting her data into the cooking robot so she will be the ingredients for the next night's dinner.

See also
List of Osamu Tezuka manga
Osamu Tezuka

External links

Manga series
Kodansha manga
Osamu Tezuka manga
Seinen manga
Shōnen manga
Horror anime and manga